University of Asia Pacific often abbreviated as UAP is a private university located at Dhaka, Bangladesh.

History
The University of Asia Pacific was established in 1995 as a private university under the Private University Act 1992 with Mr. Hedayat Ahmed as the founder Vice Chancellor. Its curriculum has been approved by The University Grants Commission of the Government of the People's Republic of Bangladesh. The university started its operation in the first semester of classes in 1996 and offered four-year bachelor's degree programs in Computer Science and Technology and Business Administration only. Now UAP offers undergraduate programs in English, Law, Architecture, Business Administration, Civil Engineering, Computer Science and Engineering, Electrical and Electronic Engineering and Pharmacy.

UAP has been sponsored by the University of Asia Pacific Foundation, a non-profit, non-commercial organization based in Dhaka, Bangladesh. C. M. Shafi Sami is the chairperson of the Board of Governors of the University of Asia Pacific Foundation.

On 5 August 2018, the University of Asia Pacific was attacked 25 men on bikes injuring students and faculty. They also vandalized the campus and according to witnesses at the scene, they were chanting pro-government slogans. Students of the university had participated in demonstrations for road safety.

Departments
 Department of Architecture
 Department of Business Administration
 Department of Computer Science and Engineering
 Department of Civil Engineering
 Department of Electrical and Electronic Engineering
 Department of English
 Department of Law and Human Rights
 Department of Pharmacy

List of vice-chancellors
 Mr. Hedayat Ahmed (September 1995 – June 2001)
 A. S. M Shahjahan 
  M. R. Kabir (March 2003 – September 2004)
 Abdul Matin Patwari (September 7, 2004 – 2012)
 Prof. Dr. Jamilur Reza Choudhury (May 2, 2012 – April 28, 2020) 
Prof. Dr. Md. Sultan Mahmud ( December 17, 2020 - February 14, 2022) 
Prof. Dr. Qumrul Ahsan (February 15, 2022 - Present)

References

Architecture schools in Bangladesh
Private universities in Bangladesh
Educational institutions established in 1996
Universities and colleges in Dhaka
1996 establishments in Bangladesh